Sint Maarten elects a legislature called the Estates of Sint Maarten. As the country has no devolved government, this is the only chosen representation of the island. It consists of 15 members, elected for a four-year term by proportional representation. The first estates were elected in 2010 as the island council of the island area Sint Maarten as the elections took place before the dissolution of the Netherlands Antilles.

Latest elections

See also
 Electoral calendar
 Electoral system

References

 
Sint Maarten